Snow in the Desert is a 1919 British silent drama film directed by Walter West and starring Violet Hopson, Stewart Rome and Poppy Wyndham. The film featured an early performance from Ronald Colman before he went to Hollywood. It was based on a serialized story in the Daily Sketch by Andrew Soutar.

Premise
A business tycoon's wife runs off with a poet, but returns to help run the company when her husband falls ill.

Cast
 Violet Hopson as Felice Beste  
 Stewart Rome as William B. Jackson  
 Poppy Wyndham 
 Simeon Stuart as Sir Michael Beste  
 Ronald Colman as Rupert Sylvester 
 Mary Masters 
 A.B. Caldwell

References

Bibliography
 Low, Rachael. History of the British Film, 1918–1929. George Allen & Unwin, 1971.

External links

1919 films
1919 drama films
British silent feature films
British drama films
Films directed by Walter West
British black-and-white films
1910s English-language films
1910s British films
Silent drama films